Siku Allooloo (born 1986) is an Inuk/Haitian Taíno writer, artist, facilitator and land-based educator from Denendeh ("the Land of the People"), Northwest Territories and Pond Inlet, Nunavut in Canada. Allooloo's works incorporates the legacies of resistance to settler colonialism, and revitalization of Indigenous communities. Through her writing, visual art, and activism, Allooloo fights against colonial violence on indigenous women. She won Briarpatch magazine's 2016 creative nonfiction contest with the piece titled "Living Death".

Educational background 
Siku Allooloo holds a Bachelor of Arts degree (BA) in anthropology and Indigenous studies from the University of Victoria. Her diverse background in cultural land-based programming, youth development, research, and solidarity serves as the foundation of her creativity.

Activism
In 2013, Allooloo drafted principles for the Indigenous Nationhood movement. This website was a call for Aboriginal nations to move away from the Indian Act and towards autonomy from the Canadian government.

She also participated in integrating the Idle No More movement into the North.

In 2016, Allooloo assisted the international organization, Human Rights Watch's investigation about police abuse of indigenous women in Saskatchewan.

In 2020, Allooloo participated in a demonstration of support for Wetʼsuwetʼen First Nation in Yukon. In late December 2019, a British Columbia judge signed off on an injunction that would prevent the Wet’suwet’en from protecting their land from the proposed Coastal GasLink Pipeline.

Career 
Her writing has been featured in Briarpatch, The Malahat Review, Nuit Blanche Toronto, Canadian Art and Surrey Art Gallery Presents, among other publications.

She was faculty for the residency "The Space Between Us: Technology, collaboration, and the future" held at the Banff Centre for Arts and Creativity. Allooloo was also the artistic producer for "Bystander: Study Guide" by the Gwaandak Theatre in 2018.

Group exhibitions and projects 
Allooloo has collaborated artistically with indigenous artists across Canada since 2014.

Exhibitions and projects include:

 2015: Allooloo participated in the Indigenous Writers Program at the Banff Centre, Alberta.
 2017: Way in Which It Was Given to Us at Surrey Art Gallery, British Columbia. Allooloo's essay was presented accompanied with Marianne Nicolson's animation for the city's annual public art project, UrbanScreen.
 2017: Life on Neebahgeezis; A Luminous Engagement, Many Possible Futures at Nuit Blanche in Toronto (2017), curated by Maria Hupfield. With an indigenous writer and academic, Jaskiran Dhillon, Allooloo conducted the commissioned project, In Conversation: Becoming an Accomplice.
 2018: Mirrored in Stone, as a part a larger project called New Chapter program funded through Canada Council for the Arts. This project created a collaborative documentary film in collaboration with Vancouver-based artists, Marianne Nicolson and Althea Thauberger with five emerging artists including Allooloo.
 2018: This world; here, Arts & Media Lab, the Isabel Bader Centre for Performing Arts, Queens University.
 2019: Hexsa'am, Morris and Helen Belkin Art Gallery'. Her piece, "Akia" was displayed through sealskin on canvas.

Publications 
Allooloo's creative non-fiction and poetry pieces appear in several journals, magazines, news articles, and academic books.

 In 2015, she wrote an article for the Northern Journal titled "Reclaim justice, end the violence."
 In 2016, Allooloo wrote Dismantling Columbus and the Power of the Present for Truthout.
 In 2016, Allooloo's creative nonfiction piece "Living Death" won Briarpatch magazine's creative nonfiction contest.
 In 2016, Allooloo's creative nonfiction piece, "Caribou People" appeared in the magazine Indigenous Perspectives. This piece was later included in the book, Shapes of Native Nonfiction: Collected Essays by Contemporary Writers, published by Washington University Press in 2019. Though depicting the feast on caribou with Allooloo's own relatives, this piece describes the impact of climate change on Indigenous people living in the north.
 In 2017, four poems, individually titled: "Because, colonialism", "Survivor’s Guilt guilt", "Stone whisperer", and "Offering", were featured in The New Quarterly.
 In 2019, the poem for "Akia" was published in Canadian Art. This piece was also displayed in 2019 exhibition "Hexsa'am: To Be Here Always." at Morris and Helen Belkin Art Gallery, through sealskin on canvas.

References

People from Pond Inlet
Inuit artists
21st-century Canadian women writers
Living people
1986 births
Canadian Inuit women
Artists from Nunavut
Writers from Nunavut
Inuit writers
21st-century Canadian writers
21st-century Canadian women artists
21st-century Canadian artists